The 1962 Belgian Grand Prix was a Formula One motor race held at Spa-Francorchamps on 17 June 1962. It was race 3 of 9 in both the 1962 World Championship of Drivers and the 1962 International Cup for Formula One Manufacturers. This race was notable for being the first Grand Prix win for Jim Clark, and the first of four consecutive victories at Spa for the Scotsman (despite thoroughly disliking the circuit) and Team Lotus. It was also the first win for the famous Lotus 25, and the beginning of the famous 6-year-long rivalry between Clark and Graham Hill. This race was held the same day as the 1962 FIFA World Cup Final in Santiago, Chile, but that event took place later in the day from this Grand Prix.

Ricardo Rodríguez became the youngest driver to score championship points (20 years, 123 days), a record which stood for 38 years before Jenson Button, aged 20 years, 67 days, broke it at the 2000 Brazilian Grand Prix. Trevor Taylor and Willy Mairesse were fighting for 2nd place until the 2 cars touched, crashed into a ditch and Mairesse's car landed upside down and caught fire. Both drivers were thrown out of their cars, but were unhurt.

Classification

Qualifying

Race

 Dan Gurney practiced in a Lotus-BRM owned by Wolfgang Seidel, but after a few laps he deemed the car unraceworthy. Gurney was also entered by the works Porsche team, along with Jo Bonnier, but the team withdrew after the factory was hit by strike action.
 The #4 entry was originally allocated to Lewis, then to Ashmore on Lewis' withdrawal. After Ashmore also withdrew, the slot was filled by John Campbell-Jones.
 Lucien Bianchi was originally entered as #14, in a Porsche prepared by Scuderia SSS Republica di Venezia, but withdrew. He later took #19 and drove Equipe National Belge's Lotus.

Championship standings after the race

Drivers' Championship standings

Constructors' Championship standings

 Notes: Only the top five positions are included for both sets of standings.

References

Belgian Grand Prix
Belgian Grand Prix
Grand Prix